Warkult is the ninth studio album by Florida death metal band Malevolent Creation.

Track listing

Personnel
Kyle Symons: All vocals
Phil Fasciana: Guitars
Rob Barrett: Guitars
Gordon Simms: Bass
Dave Culross: Drums

Production
Produced by Malevolent Creation & J.F. Dagenais
Recorded & Engineered by Phil Plaskon
Mixed By Jean-François Dagenais

References

External links
"Warkult" at discogs.com link

Malevolent Creation albums
2004 albums